Francis William Banahene Thompson was Bishop of Accra from 1983 to 1996.

Ordained in 1964 after a period of study at Kelham Theological College, he was a chaplain to the Ghanaian forces from 1968.

References

20th-century Anglican bishops in Ghana
Anglican bishops of Accra
Ghanaian military chaplains
Living people
Alumni of the Accra Academy
Year of birth missing (living people)